Solma is a village development committee in the Himalayas of Terhathum District in the Kosi Zone of eastern Nepal. At the time of the 1991 Nepal census it had a population of 4093 people living in 717 individual households.
Solma is a Village Development Committee (VDC) lies on western part of Tehrathum District. The main ethnicity distribution of this VDC is Limbu (1190), Bramans (873), Kchhetri (663), Magar (381), Gurungs(287), Newar (166), Tamang (43) Kami (119)and Dam/Darji (100), Bhujel/Gharti (47). This VDC have one high school named Ratna Higher Secondary School, one Health Post, Post Office, Agriculture and Veterinary Center.

The altitudinal distribution and ecological distribution is the beauty of this VDC. Tea (Beautiful tea Garden in Bokre), Large Cardamom, Chiraito, Ginger, Orange, Cabbage are major cash crop and Paddy, Maize, Potato, Wheat are food crops of this VDC. The VDC is also part of Tinjure Milke Jaljale (TMJ) also called capital of Rhododendron from where you can see panoramic view of Himalayan Range with Mt. Kanchanjunga, Mt Kumbhakarna, Mt. Makalu and Mt Everest.

References

External links
UN map of the municipalities of Terhathum District

Populated places in Tehrathum District